In August 1988 Apple Computer introduced the Apple Scanner. It was their first A4 (8.5 in × 14.0 in) flatbed scanner. It was capable of a 4-bit image with 16 levels of grey in a maximum resolution of 300 dpi. The scanner could complete a full scan in 20.4 seconds. It shipped with a SCSI connection with an unused serial port.

To control the scanner, it came with both AppleScan and HyperScan, the latter allowed users to scan directly from within HyperCard. Later, only AppleScan was offered.

The scanner was upgraded to the short-lived Apple OneScanner in 1991 with 256 levels of grey.

References

Apple Inc. peripherals
Imaging
Products introduced in 1988

it:Lista degli scanner Apple#Apple Scanner